Michael Ballou is an American artist who has been living in Brooklyn New York since 1983. During the 1990s, he was one of the guiding spirits of Four Walls, hosted in his garage studio, which was something of a combination of clubhouse and laboratory for the exchange of art and ideas. Besides numerous exhibitions in New York City, his work has been exhibited nationally, in Los Angeles, Providence, Boston, Miami, San Antonio, St Louis, and Minneapolis, and internationally, in Berlin, Rome, Brussels, Paris, London, and Riga. His work ranges from sculpture and mixed media to film, video and situationally-specific installation. In 1993, he inaugurated the Four Walls Slide and Film Club, an informal monthly venue for homespun time-based works that has persisted for more than 15 years.

External links 
 1997 New York Times Review by Roberta Smith
 The Honorable Discharge, a collaborative presentation with Kurt Hoffman
Interview with Mike Ballou in Zing Magazine, 2009
Audio Interview with Michael Ballou Art on Air 2010
Michael Ballou by William Corwin BOMB 113/Fall 2010, includes video links

American artists
Living people
Year of birth missing (living people)